William Henry Barnes (April 5, 1885 - September 25, 1973) was a member of the Wisconsin State Assembly.

Biography
Barnes was born in Lisbon, Juneau County, Wisconsin, on April 5, 1885. On September 25, 1973, Barnes died in New Lisbon, Wisconsin. He is buried there.

Career
Barnes was a member of the Assembly from 1935 to 1940. He was a member of the Wisconsin Progressive Party.

References

People from Juneau County, Wisconsin
Members of the Wisconsin State Assembly
Wisconsin Progressives (1924)
1885 births
1973 deaths
Burials in Wisconsin
20th-century American politicians
People from New Lisbon, Wisconsin